Montmorency railway station is located on the Hurstbridge line in Victoria, Australia. It serves the north-eastern Melbourne suburb of Montmorency, and opened on 5 September 1923.

History
Montmorency station opened on 5 September 1923, twenty-one years after the railway line from Heidelberg was extended to Hurstbridge. Like the suburb itself, the station was named after a local farm, the "Montmorency Estate", itself named after the French town Montmorency, Val-d'Oise.

In the lead-up to the 2018 State Election, the opposition Liberal Party promised A$300m to duplicate the line between Greensborough and Eltham, and provide Montmorency with a second platform.

On 15 May 2019, the Level Crossing Removal Project announced that planning for the duplication of the line between Greensborough and Eltham was underway, with the project expected to start in late 2021. The station will be rebuilt approximately 100m west of the current station, and will include a new platform. On 9 February 2021, final designs of the new station were released.

Platforms, facilities and services
Montmorency has one platform. It is located between Were Street and Mayona Road, with station access from both. There is a small sheltered waiting area, two myki top up machines, six myki touch on/off stands, and a box for Protective Services Officers (PSOs). Recently, new shelters and a third entrance to the station have been installed.

The station is served by Hurstbridge line trains.

Platform 1:
  all stations and limited express services to Flinders Street; all stations services to Eltham and Hurstbridge

Transport links 

 : (Combined) Greensborough—Templestowe—Doncaster SC—Box Hill—Deakin Uni
 : Box Hill—Greensborough via Doncaster SC

References

External links
 Melway map at street-directory.com.au

Railway stations in Melbourne
Railway stations in Australia opened in 1923
Railway stations in the City of Banyule